"Byte" is a song by Dutch DJs Martin Garrix and Brooks. It was released on 7 April 2017, via Garrix's record label Stmpd Rcrds and Sony.

Background 
Garrix debuted the song at the 2017 Ultra Music Festival in Miami. He revealed a snippet of the song on Snapchat one day prior to the festival, and on Instagram several months ago. In a tweet by Garrix, he stated he was releasing two "things" on Friday, 7 April 2017 — the song "Byte" and the acoustic version of his previous single "Scared to Be Lonely" with British singer Dua Lipa. "Byte" is described as a 'return to EDM' for Garrix as his previous singles "In the Name of Love" and "Scared to Be Lonely" were seen as pop music. Before its release, the song was compared to Garrix's 2014 collaboration "Tremor" with Dimitri Vegas & Like Mike.

Track listing

Charts

References 

Martin Garrix songs
2017 singles
2017 songs
Dutch electronic songs
Songs written by Martin Garrix
Stmpd Rcrds singles